Niq (also Romanized as Nīq and Neyaq; also known as Nīāk) is a village in Dodangeh Rural District, Hurand District, Ahar County, East Azerbaijan Province, Iran. At the 2006 census, its population was 264, in 59 families.

References 

Populated places in Ahar County